St. Mary's Catholic Church is a large and notable church in the city of Huntington, Indiana, and was completed on October 11, 1896. There are about 1500 parish members that attend St. Mary's Church. The Church is part of the Catholic Diocese of Fort Wayne-South Bend.

History
The only church was St. Peter and Paul's Catholic Church, where German was spoken. He died before he could accomplish his dream but his sister Bridget took the money that she had received for selling her brother's  estate to build St. Mary's Catholic Church. The project would cost 75,000 dollars. The cornerstone of the church was laid May 3, 1896, John Roche's 79th birthday. When completed the Church had a good review with stained glass windows from the Royal Bavarian Art Institute of Munich; with eight large columns of imported Italian granite to support the arches in the nave, the large statues and Stations of the Cross from France; the pews are made of oak, and polished red brick on the exterior. Through the years the church has gone through much and in the 1950s it had an interior remodeling. It was in the late 1940s that the church removed its three large and ornate altars as well as the elaborately carved wooden frames fitted around the current Stations of the Cross for replacements with a more modern appearance.

Today
Father Stephen Colchin is the current priest at St. Mary's. St. Mary's has partnered up with St. Peter and Paul's to help educate young children. St. Mary has a Middle School on its grounds while St. Peter and Paul's has the elementary school. The schools are still up and running while they flourish to teach young children. There was a high school but it closed due to financial problems following the 1984–85 academic year; the high school won the 1935 and 1941 Catholic High School State Basketball Tournament.

References
St. Mary's Catholic Church History (book)
St. Mary's Catholic Church (Pamphlet)

External links
Official Website

Churches in the Roman Catholic Diocese of Fort Wayne–South Bend
Churches in Huntington County, Indiana